At Your Service may refer to:
 At Your Service-Star Power, a public service program first aired on GMA Network
 At Your Service (The Circle album), a 2015 live album by The Circle
 At Your Service (Melody Club album), a 2007 greatest hits album by Melody Club
 At Your Service (TV series), an Irish makeover television programme
 "At Your Service", a 2008 episode of the American animated television series Chowder